Juan David Caicedo Vasquez (born April 12, 1996) is a Colombian professional footballer who plays for Patriotas Boyacá.

Career

Club career
After a spell in Brazil, Caicedo returned to Colombia for the 2020 season and joined Patriotas Boyacá.

References

External links
 
 
 Juan Caicedo at ZeroZero

Living people
1996 births
Colombian footballers
Colombian expatriate footballers
Association football central defenders
Universitario Popayán footballers
Santos Laguna footballers
Tampico Madero F.C. footballers
Esporte Clube XV de Novembro (Jaú) players
Patriotas Boyacá footballers
Categoría Primera B players
Liga MX players
Ascenso MX players
People from Tumaco
Colombian expatriate sportspeople in Mexico
Colombian expatriate sportspeople in Brazil
Expatriate footballers in Mexico
Expatriate footballers in Brazil
Sportspeople from Nariño Department